The 2020 GMR Grand Prix, was an IndyCar Series event scheduled for July 4, 2020 and was the second of fourteen rounds of the 2020 IndyCar Series Season. It was originally scheduled for May 9, but was postponed due to the COVID-19 pandemic. As a result of the postponement, the race was run as a double-header event with the NASCAR Xfinity Series, with IndyCar sharing the card with the Shell 150 NASCAR Xfinity Series event, the day before the NASCAR Cup Series Big Machine Hand Sanitizer 400.  The race was also reduced from 85 laps to 80 laps to compensate for the compacted schedule, and is the first of two meetings held on the Indianapolis Motor Speedway Road Course.  The second road course meeting was held October 2–4 as part of the Harvest Auto Racing Classic featuring the Intercontinental GT Challenge.  It was the inaugural NASCAR meeting race for INDYCAR.

Qualifying
Qualifying was held Friday, July 3, with the first session beginning at 4:30 p.m. EST. With temperatures much higher than the normal May date the event had normally been run at, qualifying times were slower than in years previous. Will Power qualified on pole position with a time of 1:10.1779, besting Jack Harvey and Colton Herta. Rookie Oliver Askew set the fastest time of the day in the second round of qualifying with a 1:09.8780, but wore out his tires in doing so, causing him to only manage 5th place in the Firestone Fast 6 session.

Race

Race statistics

Average speed: 

Lead changes: 10

Championship standings after the race
Drivers' Championship standings

References

2020 in IndyCar
2020 in sports in Indiana
July 2020 sports events in the United States